Raoul Silva (real name Tiago Rodriguez) is a fictional character and the main antagonist in the 2012 James Bond film Skyfall. He is portrayed by Javier Bardem. A former MI6 agent, he turns to cyberterrorism and begins targeting the agency he used to work for as part of a plan to get revenge against M, against whom he holds a homicidal grudge.

Bardem received critical acclaim for his performance, and Silva is regularly ranked among the greatest villains in the Bond film series.

Backstory
Skyfall establishes that Silva's real name is Tiago Rodriguez, and that he once specialized in cyberterrorism at Station H, the MI6 station based in Hong Kong, before China took control in 1997. When he ignored orders and hacked into the Chinese government's top secret files, M, who was the head of Station H at the time, allowed them to take him prisoner in exchange for the return of six previously captured agents and a peaceful handover. He was tortured for five months, until finally he attempted suicide by swallowing a cyanide capsule hidden in a false tooth. He survived, but was left disfigured with a misshapen jaw, rotted teeth and a sunken left eye socket. He wears a dental prosthetic to conceal his disfigurements. At some point he escaped from Chinese custody and reinvented himself as Raoul Silva, a cyberterrorist for hire, and began forming a plan to get revenge against M.

Skyfall
One of Silva's henchmen, Patrice, steals a hard drive containing the names and locations of MI6 agents operating undercover within terrorist groups; Silva begins uploading their identities and aliases onto YouTube, resulting in several agents being murdered. Silva then targets MI6 headquarters by sabotaging the building's gas main, causing an explosion that kills several agents. M sends Bond to Shanghai to find and kill Silva. Bond seduces Silva's lover, a prostitute named Sévérine, who promises to take Bond to him in return for her freedom; ultimately,  however, Silva intimidates her into betraying Bond. Upon taking Bond captive, Silva forces him at gunpoint to participate in a game of William Tell, in which the target is a shot glass of scotch balanced on Sevérine's head. After Bond intentionally misses her, Silva shoots her dead. Bond then kills Silva's men, and, moments later, Royal Navy helicopters arrive to take Silva into custody, having been signaled by an emergency distress radio given to Bond by Q.

At MI6's underground headquarters in London, M confronts Silva, who taunts her that his plan is already in motion. Q attempts to decrypt Silva's laptop, but inadvertently gives it access to the MI6 systems, allowing Silva to escape from MI6 custody. Q realizes that Silva wanted to be captured as part of a plan to kill M.

Silva flees into the London Underground, with Bond in pursuit. Silva diverts through London's sewers. When Bond finally catches up to him, Silva detonates an explosive charge that sends a runaway underground train coming straight for Bond, who narrowly escapes. Silva, along with several accomplices, barge into a government inquiry where M is giving a deposition, but fails to kill her. Bond barges in and a gunfight ensues, in which Silva's plans are disrupted and Bond manages to flee, taking M with him.

Silva follows Bond and M to "Skyfall", Bond's childhood home in Scotland, where his men open fire, mortally wounding M. He pursues her to a chapel at the side of the house, and begs her to kill them both by firing a bullet through her head and into his. At that moment, however, Bond appears and throws a knife into Silva's back, killing him. M dies shortly after in Bond's arms.

In other films
In the following Bond film, Spectre, Ernst Stavro Blofeld reveals that Silva had been a member of SPECTRE, a worldwide criminal organization, along with Le Chiffre and Dominic Greene, the villains of Casino Royale and Quantum of Solace, respectively.

Sexuality
The scene in which Silva and Bond first met attracted commentary among critics and fans alike for its homoerotic subtext. In the scene Silva strokes Bond's thighs and chest while interrogating the secret agent, who is tied to a chair.

Silva: Ooh, see what she's done to you.
Bond: Yes, well, she never tied me to a chair.
Silva: Her loss. [begins tracing along Bond's chest with his finger]
Bond: Are you sure this is about M?
Silva: It's about her, and you, and me. You see we are the last two rats, we can either eat each other... [lascivious grin] ...or we can eat everyone else. Ah, you're trying to think back to your training. What's the regulation to cover this? Oh well... [strokes Bond's thighs] ... there's a first time for everything.
Bond: What makes you think this is my first time?
Silva: Oh, Mr. Bond!

The scene ignited speculation that screenwriter John Logan, who is gay, intended to imply that Silva is gay or bisexual. Logan denied this in an interview with The Huffington Post, saying, "Some people claim it's because I'm, in fact, gay but not true at all. [Director Sam Mendes] and I were discussing, there were so many scenes in which Bond goes mano-a-mano with the villain, whether it's Dr. No or Goldfinger or whatever, and there's been so many ways to a cat-and-mouse and intimidate Bond, and we thought, what would make the audience truly uncomfortable is sexual intimidation; playing the homoerotic card that is sort of always there subtextually with characters like Scaramanga in 'Man With the Golden Gun' or Dr. No. So we just decided we would play the card and enjoy it."

Barbara Broccoli later admitted there was some pressure to remove this scene from the movie, but she insisted to keep it in the final release.

References

Bond villains
Film characters introduced in 2012
Fictional characters with disfigurements
Fictional attempted suicides
Fictional hackers
Fictional mass murderers
Fictional secret agents and spies
Skyfall
Fictional terrorists
Male film villains
Action film villains
Fictional crime bosses
Film supervillains